Melvin Luther Duncan, nicknamed "Buck", was an American Negro leagues baseball player.  He was born in 1929. He played from 1949 to 1956.  He played with the  Kansas City Monarchs and the Detroit Stars  Melvin was a pitcher.  He was a member of the US Army and played on the Army Team. Duncan additionally played in Venezuela.   He was honored in 2014 for his participation in baseball.

Duncan died in Ypsilanti, Michigan in 2016 at age 87.

See also
List of Negro league baseball players (A–D)

References

External links
Melvin Duncan at Negro Leagues Baseball Museum

1929 births
2016 deaths
Detroit Stars players
Kansas City Monarchs players
20th-century African-American sportspeople
Baseball pitchers
21st-century African-American people